Laureano López Rodó (18 November 1920 – 11 March 2000) was a Spanish lawyer, diplomat and politician who served as Minister of Foreign Affairs and as Commissioner and later Minister for Development Planning during the rule of Francisco Franco.

He died during the night of 11 March 2000 aged 79. He is interred at Cementerio de la Almudena.

References

|-

Foreign ministers of Spain
1920 births
2000 deaths